RHS may stand for:

 Ramsay Hunt syndrome, several medical conditions
 Rectangular hollow section, a type of metal profile
 Retired husband syndrome
 Revue d'histoire de la Shoah, an academic journal about the Holocaust (Shoah) published in France
 Right-hand side of an equation
 Royal Horticultural Society
 Royal Hospital School, an independent naval school at Holbrook, Suffolk
 Rural Housing Service, in the USDA Rural Development Agency
 Radnor High School, a public high school in Radnor, Pennsylvania
 Ralston High School
 Richmond High School (Richmond, California)
 Richmond Secondary School
 Ridgeline High School (Utah), a public high school in Millville, Utah
 Ridgeline High School (Washington), a public high school in Liberty Lake, Washington